Hygrochloa is a genus of Australian plants in the grass family.

 Species
 Hygrochloa aquatica Lazarides - Western Australia, Northern Territory
 Hygrochloa cravenii Lazarides - Queensland, Northern Territory

References

Panicoideae
Poaceae genera
Endemic flora of Australia